Digger is a 1993 Canadian comedy-drama film starring Leslie Nielsen, Adam Hann-Byrd, Joshua Jackson, Timothy Bottoms, Barbara Williams, and Olympia Dukakis. The film premiered on September 30, 1993, at the Vancouver International Film Festival. The Film was released in Canada on April 22, 1994.

Plot
A 12-year old young boy (Adam Hann-Byrd) is sent to live with relatives when his parents break up. He befriends a dying boy (Joshua Jackson) who has an eerie connection with nature.

Cast

Production
The film was shot in Canada, in September to November 1992.

Awards 
 1994: Best Achievement in Art direction/Production design, Mark S. Freeborn 
 1994: Best Music Score, Todd Boekelheide

External links

1993 films
English-language Canadian films
American comedy-drama films
Canadian comedy-drama films
Films shot in British Columbia
1993 comedy-drama films
1990s English-language films
1990s American films
1990s Canadian films